Didier Hesse (17 March 1901 – 13 August 1974) was a French sports shooter. He competed in the 25 m pistol event at the 1948 Summer Olympics.

References

External links
 

1901 births
1974 deaths
French male sport shooters
Olympic shooters of France
Shooters at the 1948 Summer Olympics
Place of birth missing